Devabhai Punjabhai Malam is an Indian politician, Member of legislative assembly from the Keshod constituency and State Minister for Ministry of Fisheries, Animal Husbandry and Dairying in the Gujarat government. Mr. Malam belong to the Koli caste of Gujarat.

He is a businessman and agriculturist by profession.

See also 
 Bhupendra Patel

References 

Living people
1958 births
Bharatiya Janata Party politicians from Gujarat